Robert Vincent Jude "Dodot" Bautista Jaworski Jr. (born October 14, 1971) is a Filipino politician, businessman, and former basketball player who is the vice mayor of Pasig. He previously served as a member of House of Representatives representing the Lone District of Pasig from 2004 to 2007.

Basketball career
Jaworski was drafted by PBA team Ginebra San Miguel in 1995 to join his father, then playing coach Robert Jaworski Sr. Together, they won one championship together in 1997 PBA Commissioner's Cup playing as the Gordon's Gin Boars.

He played for the Ginebra San Miguel from 1995 to 1998 being only the father-and-son tandem of Philippine basketball. He retired in 1999 at the age of 28, together with his father.

Political career
Jaworski began his political career as a councilor in the Municipality of San Juan in 1995, at the age of 23. In 1998, he served as Chief of Staff at the office of his father, Senator Jaworski, for six years. 

In 2004, Jaworski was elected as congressman of the lone district of Pasig, defeating then-incumbent congressman Noel "Toti" Cariño, who would later become his party mate in 2006. In 2006, he filed a congressional resolution to investigate the alleged hurried demolition of shanty settlements ordered by Mayor Vicente Eusebio in connection in connection with the shabu market raid in Mapayapa Compound, Barangay Santo Tomas. On December 12, 2006, he escaped injury alongside his brother Ryan and their driver after jumping out of their van, which exploded along C-5 Road.

He ran for Mayor of Pasig in 2007 under the political party called Partido Pasigueño, but lost to the incumbent Mayor's son, 2nd district councilor Bobby Eusebio. The early part of the election vote tally showed Jaworski leading, but was overtaken by Eusebio. Jaworski later promised to file a protest against Eusebio. 

During his political hiatus, Jaworski focused on business, leading at least five firms in the hospitality, education and construction sectors.

On September 23, 2021, Jaworski announced that he would be running for vice mayor of Pasig in 2022. He was invited as the running mate of Mayor Vico Sotto under Aksyon Demokratiko. He won the vice mayoralty race in a landslide victory, defeating his two opponents.

References

1971 births
Barangay Ginebra San Miguel players
Living people
Basketball players from Quezon City
People from Pasig
Metro Manila city and municipal councilors
Robert
21st-century Filipino businesspeople
Filipino men's basketball players
Filipino people of Polish descent
Members of the House of Representatives of the Philippines from Pasig
Lakas–CMD (1991) politicians
Ateneo Blue Eagles men's basketball players
Lakas–CMD politicians
Aksyon Demokratiko politicians
Filipino sportsperson-politicians